Funk Drops is the third album by American jazz vibraphonist Freddie McCoy which was recorded in 1966 for the Prestige label.

Reception

Allmusic rated the album 2 stars.

Track listing
All compositions by Freddie McCoy except where noted.
 "My Babe" (Willie Dixon) – 3:00   
 "And I Love Her" (John Lennon, Paul McCartney) – 6:00   
 "High Heel Sneakers" (Robert Higgenbotham) – 3:25   
 "Moyé" – 6:30   
 "Funk Drops" – 3:15   
 "Tough Talk" (Wayne Henderson, Joe Sample, Stix Hooper) – 3:30   
 "Theodora" (Billy Taylor) – 4:05   
 "The Sleepy Lagoon"  (Eric Coates, Jack Lawrence) – 4:20  
Recorded at Van Gelder Studio in Englewood Cliffs, New Jersey on June 21 (tracks 1, 5 & 8) and June 22 (tracks 2-4, 6 & 7), 1965

Personnel 
Freddie McCoy – vibraphone 
James Robinson – trumpet (tracks 1, 5 & 8)
Laurdine Patrick – baritone saxophone (tracks 1, 5 & 8)
John Blair – electric violin (tracks 1, 5 & 8)
JoAnne Brackeen – piano (tracks 2-4, 6 & 7)  
Alfred Williams – organ (tracks 1, 5 & 8)
Augustus Turner – bass (tracks 2-4, 6 & 7)
Albert Winston – electric bass (tracks 1, 5 & 8)
Bernard Purdie (tracks 1, 5 & 8), George Scott (tracks 2-4, 6 & 7) – drums

References 

1966 albums
Freddie McCoy albums
Prestige Records albums
Albums recorded at Van Gelder Studio
Albums produced by Cal Lampley